Kjetil Person Siem (born September 29, 1960) is a Norwegian businessperson, journalist, author and sports official. He was the CEO of Premier Soccer League in South Africa between 2007 and 2010, and is currently Secretary-general of the Football Association of Norway.

Early life and career
He was born to parents Per and Ragnhild Siem on a small farm in Gjerdset in Rauma. His father was a farmer and his family was involved in sheep-raising and forestry. He and was educated as a drama-teacher specializing in theater, but he would soon make his way in the sports world. He started out as a sports journalist, first in Aftenposten and later as a reporter covering sports for TV 2. He has authored several books, including children's books and a novel.

Sports career
In 1997 he founded the website-based company Sportsprofiler (later Icons), who at one time developed web-pages up to 80 percent of top football players in Norway, England and Germany. The same year he authored the football books Proff i England ("Professional in England"),  and Æ, a biography of Ole Gunnar Solskjær, in 1998. In 2001 he was hired as director of football in the Oslo club Vålerenga, and from 2003 to 2005 he was worked as the managing director. During his tenure with the club Vålerenga won both silver and gold medals as well as making economic profit.

After a period as director in Norsk Toppfotball from 2006 to 2007 he was hired as chief executive of the South African Premier Soccer League in 2007. His tenure coincided with the 2010 FIFA World Cup, and he was among other things responsible for the opening match at Soccer City stadium. In 2012 he was appointed Secretary-General for the Football Association of Norway, replacing Paul Glomsaker. He immediately began a campaign to improve fair-play within Norwegian football, he introduced the Handshake for peace in which the two teams captains makes an obligatory handshake at the final whistle, this was in cooperation with the Nobel Peace Center. Siem started in 1994 the Soccer against crime project in Cape Town, South Africa and has since been involved in helping deprived communities.

Personal life
Born into a farming family with five brothers, his eldest brother Stein has since taken over the farm after his father. He helped start the local annual Mountain Festival in Rauma in 1998. He currently resides in Lørenskog with his wife Irene, and four children.

Bibliography
1997 - Profesjonell i England (Professional in England)1998 - Æ : A biography of Ole Gunnar Solskjær, 2008 - Begynner på P'',

References

1960 births
Living people
People from Møre og Romsdal
People from Lørenskog
Norwegian journalists
Norwegian biographers
Norwegian male writers
Male biographers
TV 2 (Norway) people
Norwegian sports executives and administrators
Norwegian expatriates in South Africa